Monique de Beer (born 29 May 1975, Tilburg) is a Dutch wheelchair tennis player (singles and doubles). She won a bronze medal.

Career 
At the 2004 Summer Paralympics in Athens , where she and Bas van Erp won bronze in the Mixed Doubles Quad. 

At the 2008 Summer Paralympics, in Beijing, she also competed for the Netherlands in Mixed Singles Quad.

She competed at the 2008 British Open, Belgian Open, BNP Paribas French Open, and Japan Open.

De Beer is a teacher, and lives in Riel .

References 

Paralympic bronze medalists for the Netherlands
Living people
Paralympic wheelchair tennis players of the Netherlands
1975 births